In strategy computer games, of both the turn-based and real-time varieties, a build order is a linear pattern of production, research, and resource management aimed at achieving a specific and specialized goal. They are analogous to chess openings, in that a player will have a specific order of play in mind, however the amount the build order, the strategy around which the build order is built or even which build order is then used varies on the skill, ability and other factors such as how aggressive or defensive each player is.

Often, the name of a build order usually reflects two key aspects therein:
 The desired goal of the entire build order.
 The key management decisions involved in the build order.

Evidence of this can be found in the following examples:
 Six-Pool Rush (StarCraft) – Six-Pool being the management decision (build a Spawning Pool immediately after reaching supply level 6), rush implying production of zerglings quickly.
 4 Warp Gate Push (StarCraft II) – opening in which the goal is to have a Warp Gate and 4 gateways and then push (attack the enemy).
 Rule of Ten (Warhammer 40,000: Dawn of War) – Ten being the desired production goal of infantry units.
 Oranos 4:30 (Age of Mythology: The Titans) – 4:30 being the desired time to reach tech level 2.
 4ES (Company of Heroes) - 4ES standing for 4 Engineers and a Sniper (a unique American opening); 
 Fast Armored Car (Company of Heroes) – the objective being to get an Armored Car before the opponent has reached the same tech level.
 Riflestall (Company of Heroes) – the objective being to use the power and flexibility of Riflemen squads to hold off the opponent before pulling out higher-tech units.
 Piospam (Company of Heroes) – the objective being to produce large numbers of Pioneers and nothing else, until  higher tier.
 Expansion first (generic): start by creating a new economic base, prioritizing your economy output rather than defensive or offensive units. This is usually easily countered if your opponent if going for an early-aggression build order.

Strategy computer games typically offer a player many choices in which structures to build, units to train, and which technologies to research. Each technology that a player researches will open up more options, but may or may not, depending on the computer game the player is playing, close off the paths to other options. A tech tree is the representation of all possible paths of research a player can take. Analysis of the tech tree leads to specific paths that a player can take to optimally advance specific strategic or tactical goals. These optimized paths are build orders.

For example, a player who plans to launch an attack by air may only build the structures necessary to construct air units and may research only the technologies which enhance the capabilities of air units. The order in which to build those structures and research those technologies is known as a build order. The same player could instead choose a slightly different build order that goes for air units but also creates a small ground-defense army – this would be a more defensive, less risky choice at the expense of having maximum airspace power.

As you can see in the list above build orders are usually used to determine how a player will start the game, which is why they are often miscalled "openings". There are many reasons for this: a flawed game start could mean that you lose the game early on, so it is important to have resilient openings; how you start a match most often than not narrows the middle and late-game options so the very first few choices alone dictate your future options; middle and late game choices require you to study the current situation so not only are they harder to plan ahead but then one also has more time to think, while on the very beginning it is more advantageous to have a fixed plan and execute it as fast and precisely as possible. Build orders can also plan ahead for late-game scenarios but that is less common.

Build orders often involve significant timing issues. This applies to both turn-based and real-time strategy games. In turn-based games, specific buildings and technologies will take a specific number of turns to complete. A build order may involve waiting until specific turns to begin building the next building or researching the next technology. In real-time strategy games, timing may be even more crucial. To execute an optimal rush, a player will not only have to know exactly what to build or research but also when to do so. If the build order is altered in any way, the units or structures may not be produced as quickly. The delay may mean the difference between a game win and a game loss.

Experienced players of strategy games will memorize build orders, as it gives them a significant advantage over players who are not familiar with build orders. This is particularly important in games where there is a resource cap such as food in the WarCraft series or supply in the StarCraft series, as a player must know how much remaining supply they have to work with for a given build order. Since the game mechanics will not permit players to build past this limit without additional resource structures the build order and the timing of new construction must be implemented in a very precise manner.

Build orders involve all forms of resource management, including unit production and control. The loss of a unit or the overproduction of another may delay or change the course of a build order. Complex build orders that involve a combination of key units may fail completely due to improper unit control, despite correct development of buildings and technology research.

In professional and competitive tournaments it is implicit that before a match each player will have studied his opponent's recent public games in order to prepare an appropriate build order to defeat his style. Since both players understand that each side will be doing this it can create interesting situations – for example: a defense-oriented player could pretend to be using his traditional strategy to fool his opponent, while instead creating an offensive force in a hard-to-spot position. This makes competitive strategy gaming as much a guessing of what your opponent is trying to do as it is on focusing on your own strategy in order to win. This sort of play is often called mind games by narrators and commentators and it often happens that a bad "read" on an opponent's intentions is enough to lose a match.

Video game gameplay
Esports terminology